A Christmas Album is the first Christmas album by American singer-songwriter James Taylor released on a limited-edition basis in 2004, with distribution through Hallmark stores. The albums were also not carried by all Hallmark Cards stockists.

Track listing 
 "Winter Wonderland" with Chris Botti (Dick Smith, Felix Bernard) – 3:36
 "Go Tell It on the Mountain" (Traditional) – 3:48
 "In the Bleak Midwinter" (Traditional) – 4:18
 "Baby, It's Cold Outside" with Natalie Cole (Frank Loesser) – 4:19
 "Santa Claus Is Coming to Town" (Haven Gillespie, John Frederick Coots) – 2:58
 "Jingle Bells" (Traditional) – 3:55
 "The Christmas Song (Chestnuts Roasting on an Open Fire)" with Toots Thielemans (Mel Tormé, Robert Wells) – 3:54
 "Deck the Halls" (Traditional) – 2:51
 "Some Children See Him" (Alfred Burt, Wihla Hutson) – 4:41
 "Who Comes This Night" (Dave Grusin, Sally Stevens) – 4:17
 "Auld Lang Syne" (Traditional) – 3:41

The album originally came with an online code that could be used to download an outtake from the sessions, a cover of Joni Mitchell's "River".  In 2006, Taylor's regular label, Columbia Records, reissued the album under a new title (James Taylor at Christmas) and cover. This new version also altered the track listing, with "Deck the Halls" removed and two other songs ("Have Yourself a Merry Little Christmas" and the aforementioned cover of "River") added.

Personnel 
 James Taylor – lead vocals, guitars (2, 6, 8, 11), arrangements (2, 3, 6, 8)
 Dave Grusin – arrangements, acoustic piano (1, 4, 5, 6, 9, 10, 11), celesta (7, 10)
 Larry Goldings – melodica (2, 3, 11), harmonium (3, 8, 11), organ (6), acoustic piano (7)
 John Pizzarelli – guitars (1, 5, 7, 11)
 George Doering – guitars (2, 3, 4, 6, 10)
 Michael Landau – guitars (2, 3, 4, 6, 8, 11)
 Dave Carpenter – bass (1, 5, 7, 10, 11)
 Jimmy Johnson – bass (2, 3, 4, 6)
 Vinnie Colaiuta – drums (1–7, 11)
 Luis Conte – percussion (2, 4, 6, 10)
 Michael Fisher – percussion (8)
 Ralph Williams – bass clarinet (1)
 Gary Gray – clarinet (1)
 Bill Liston – clarinet (1)
 Dan Higgins – flute (1)
 Phil Ayling – English horn (1), oboe (1)
 Chris Botti – trumpet (1)
 Toots Thielemans – harmonica (7)
 David Lasley – backing vocals (1, 2, 8, 10)
 Kate Markowitz – backing vocals (1, 2, 8, 10)
 Arnold McCuller – backing vocals (1, 2, 8, 10)
 Andrea Zonn – violin, backing vocals (1, 2, 8, 10)
 Natalie Cole – lead vocals (4)

Strings (1–5, 7, 9, 10)
 Ralph Morrison – concertmaster 
 Steve Erdody, Paula Hochhalter and Cecilia Tsan – cello
 Edward Mears – contrabass
 Karen Elaine Bakunin, Brian Dembow, Marlow Fisher, Roland Kato and Vicki Miskolczy – viola
 Jackie Brand, Bruce Dukov, Julie Gigante, Alan Grunfield, Clayton Haslop, Tamara Hatwan, Natalie Leggett, Ralph Morrison, Claudia Parducci, Sara Parkins, Katia Popov, Josefina Vergara, Margaret Wooten and Kenneth Yerke – violin

Production 
 Dave Grusin – producer, liner notes 
 Don Murray – recording, mixing 
 Charlie Paakkari – assistant engineer
 Robert Vosgien – mastering at Capitol Mastering (Hollywood, California).
 Gary Borman – management 
 Barbara Rose Granatt – management
 James Taylor – liner notes

References

James Taylor albums
Christmas albums by American artists
2004 Christmas albums
Folk rock Christmas albums
Pop rock Christmas albums
Albums recorded at Capitol Studios